Walter Strother Davis (August 9, 1905 – October 1979) was an American football coach and college administrator. He was the second president of Tennessee State University, a historically black university in Nashville, Tennessee, from 1943 to 1968.

Early life
Davis was born on August 9, 1905 in Canton, Mississippi. He graduated from Tennessee A&I (later known as Tennessee State University) with a bachelor's degree 1931, and attended Cornell University, where he earned a master's in 1933 and a Ph.D. in 1941.

Career
Davis was the eighth head football coach at Tennessee A&I State College—now known as Tennessee State University—in Nashville, Tennessee and he held that position for four seasons, from 1933 until 1936, compiling a record of later 19–7–4.

Davis served as the second president of Tennessee State University from 1943 to 1968. His tenure saw significant expansion, including the construction of "70 percent of the school's facilities", the establishment of the graduate school and four other schools, and "15,000 degrees awarded."

In 1960, Davis served on a committee chaired by Madison Sarratt to put an end to the Nashville sit-ins.

When a race riot occurred on the TSU campus after Stokely Carmichael spoke in Nashville on April 8, 1967, Davis deplored that his efforts to bring social mobility regardless of racist oppression had failed.

Personal life and death
Davis married Ivanetta Hughes in 1936. They had a son, who became a physician. Davis owned a ranch in Dickson, Tennessee.

Davis died at a Nashville hospital in 1979 of a long illness.

References

External links
 

1905 births
1979 deaths
African-American academics
African-American coaches of American football
African-American players of American football
Cornell University alumni
Tennessee State Tigers football coaches
Tennessee State Tigers football players
Tennessee State University presidents
People from Canton, Mississippi
People from Dickson, Tennessee
20th-century African-American sportspeople